

History

During the early years of spaceflight only nation states had the resources to develop and fly spacecraft. Both the U.S. space program and Soviet space program were operated using mainly military pilots as astronauts. During this period, no commercial space launches were available to private operators, and no private organization was able to offer space launches.

In the 1980s, the European Space Agency created Arianespace, the world's first commercial space transportation company, and, following the Challenger disaster, the American government deregulated the American space transportation market as well. In the 1990s the Russian government sold their majority stake in RSC Energia to private investors (although it has recently renationalized the Russian space sector in 2013–2014.) 
These events for the first time allowed private organizations to purchase, develop and offer space launch services; beginning the period of private spaceflight in the late-1980s and early-1990s.

Satellite manufacturers
There are 10 major companies that build large, commercial, Geosynchronous satellite platforms:

In addition to those above, the following companies have successfully built and launched (smaller) satellite platforms:

Launch vehicle manufacturers and providers of third party services

Commercial wings of national space agencies:
 Aerospace Industrial Development Corporation (AIDC) and Taiwan Aerospace Industry Association (TAIA) Taiwan
 Antrix Corporation India
 China Aerospace Science and Technology Corporation China
Aerockets

Lander, rover and probe manufacturers

Spacecraft component manufacturers

Propulsion manufacturers

See also
List of private spaceflight companies including only companies with primarily private funding and missions ("NewSpace")
Russian aerospace industry

References

spacecraft manufacturers